Treasure is a limited edition compilation album by Holly Cole Trio. It was released in Canada in 1998 on Alert Records.  It is a collection of "Hits and Previously Unreleased Tracks" from 1989-1993. However, the sleeve notes concede that Last Rose Of Summer dates from January 1995 but "it is one of Holly's favourites". There are 6 previously released tracks and 8 previously unreleased recordings.

Critical reception
Heather Phares of AllMusic writes, "Though this collection doesn't attempt to be as complete as Blue Note's The Best of Holly Cole, Treasure 1989-1993 does offer a nice sampling of work from Cole's early years."

Track listing 

 Previously Unreleased
 New recording

Track information and credits adapted from the album's liner notes.

Musicians

Holly ColeArranger (tracks 1-14), Vocals (tracks 1-13)
David PiltchArranger (tracks 1-11, 13-14), Bass (tracks 1-11), Percussion (tracks 9-10)
Aaron DavisArranger(tracks 1-11, 13-14), Organ (track 13), Piano (tracks 1-11, 13)
Mark KelsoDrums (track 13), Hi Hat (track 12)
George KollerBass (tracks 12-13)
Kim RatcliffeGuitars (track 13)

Production

Holly ColeProducer
Greg CohenProducer
Craig StreetProducer
David WasProducer
Peter MooreEngineer, Mixing, Producer
Danny KopelsonEngineer, Mixing
Joe FerlaEngineer, Mixing
George GravesRemastering
Scott MurleyRemastering
Jeff WolpertEngineer, Mixing, Remastering
Leanne UngarEngineer, Mixing
Rodney BowesPackage Design
Andrew MacNaughtanPhotography

References

Holly Cole albums
1998 compilation albums
Alert Records albums